VFA-106, a U.S. Navy strike fighter squadron
State Route 106 (Virginia)